Ed Hinton may refer to:

 Ed Hinton (sportswriter) (born 1948), former American motorsports columnist
 Ed Hinton (actor) (1919–1958), American actor